At least 28 people were killed and 79 people injured after a fuel tanker explosion in Tleil, Akkar District, Lebanon on 15 August 2021. The disaster was reportedly exacerbated by the ongoing Lebanese liquidity crisis; in which the Lebanese pound has plummeted and fuel has been in short supply.

The survivors were evacuated by the Lebanese Red Cross.

In response the Lebanese Army opened an investigation into the incident. The fuel tanker had been confiscated by the Lebanese Armed Forces from black marketeers, the fuel was then distributed/taken by the locals. The son of the man whose land the fuel tanker was located on, was later arrested, accused of deliberately causing the explosion.

References 

2021 disasters in Lebanon
2021 in Lebanon

Explosion
August 2021 events in Asia
Explosions in 2021
Explosions in Lebanon
Tanker explosions